The Silver Throne ( or ) is a throne which has been used by the Swedish monarch at coronations, accessions to the throne and state opening of the parliament. The Silver Throne is located in the Hall of State at Stockholm Palace. 

The Silver Throne was made for Queen Christina's coronation in 1650. Crafted by Abraham Drentwett in Augsburg, Bavaria, it was a gift from Count Magnus Gabriel De la Gardie. It was last used in 1975.

Trivia
A replica of the throne was made for the Greta Garbo film Queen Christina in 1933, and then also used in the 1989 Batman film as the throne of the Joker.

References 

Individual thrones
Swedish monarchy
Christina, Queen of Sweden